The 2013 Los Angeles Angels of Anaheim season was the franchise's 53rd season and 48th in Anaheim (all of them at Angel Stadium of Anaheim).

Standings

Season standings

American League West

American League Wild Card

Record vs. opponents

Roster

Game log

|- align="center" bgcolor="bbffbb"
| 1 || April 1 || @ Reds || 3–1 (13) || Lowe (1–0) || Hoover (0–1) || Frieri (1) || 43,168 || 1–0 || 4h 44m || W1
|- align="center" bgcolor="ffbbbb"
| 2 || April 3 || @ Reds || 4–5 || Chapman (1–0) || Downs (0–1) || || 35,257 || 1–1 || 3h 06m || L1
|- align="center" bgcolor="ffbbbb"
| 3 || April 4 || @ Reds || 4–5 || Arroyo (1–0) || Blanton (0–1) || Chapman (1) || 23,795 || 1–2 || 2h 51m || L2
|- align="center" bgcolor="ffbbbb"
| 4 || April 5 || @ Rangers || 2–3 || Scheppers (1–0) || Downs (0–2) || Nathan (1) || 48,845 || 1–3 || 2h 46m || L3
|- align="center" bgcolor="bbffbb"
| 5 || April 6 || @ Rangers || 8–4 || Hanson (1–0) || Harrison (0–2) || || 47,201 || 2–3 || 3h 00m || W1
|- align="center" bgcolor="ffbbbb"
| 6 || April 7 || @ Rangers || 3–7 || Darvish (2–0) || Weaver (0–1) || || 42,034 || 2–4 || 3h 01m || L1
|- align="center" bgcolor="ffbbbb"
| 7 || April 9 || Athletics || 5–9 || Cook (1–0) || Jepsen (0–1) || || 44,014 || 2–5 || 3h 44m || L3
|- align="center" bgcolor="ffbbbb"
| 8 || April 10 || Athletics || 5–11 || Milone (2–0) || Blanton (0–2) || || 36,011 || 2–6 || 3h 47m || L4
|- align="center" bgcolor="ffbbbb"
| 9 || April 11 || Athletics || 1–8 || Griffin (2–0) || Vargas (0–1) || || 43,533 || 2–7 || 2h 59m || L5
|- align="center" bgcolor="ffbbbb"
| 10 || April 12 || Astros || 0–5 || Norris (2–1) || Hanson (1–1) || || 37,674 || 2–8 || 3h 23m || L6
|- align="center" bgcolor="bbffbb"
| 11 || April 13 || Astros || 4–5 || Roth (1–0) || Veras (0–1) || || 43,520 || 3–8 || 3h 10m || W1
|- align="center" bgcolor="bbffbb"
| 12 || April 14 || Astros || 4–1 || Wilson (1–0) || Humber (0–3) || Frieri (2) || 36,126 || 4–8 || 3h 03m || W2
|- align="center" bgcolor="ffbbbb"
| 13 || April 15 || @ Twins || 2–8 || Correia (1–1) || Blanton (0–3) || || 23,535 || 4–9 || 2h 49m || L1
|- align="center" bgcolor="ffbbbb"
| 14 || April 16 || @ Twins || 6–8 || Pelfrey (2–1) || Vargas (0–2) || Perkins (3) || 23,299 || 4–10 || 3h 30m || L2
|- style="background:#bbbbbb;"
| – || April 17 || @ Twins ||colspan=8| Postponed (rain). Makeup date September 9th.
|- align="center" bgcolor="bbffbb"
| 15 || April 19 || Tigers || 8–1 || Hanson (2–1) || Sánchez (2–1) || || 39,023 || 5–10 || 3h 04m || W1
|- align="center" bgcolor="bbffbb"
| 16 || April 20 || Tigers || 10–0 || Richards (1–0) || Porcello (0–2) || || 35,081 || 6–10 || 2h 52m || W2
|- align="center" bgcolor="bbffbb"
| 17 || April 21 || Tigers || 4–3 (13) || Williams (1–0) || Coke (0–2) || || 41,147 || 7–10 || 4h 28m || W3
|- align="center" bgcolor="ffbbbb"
| 18 || April 22 || Rangers || 6–7 || Scheppers (2–0) || Frieri (0–1) || Nathan (6) || 36,192 || 7–11 || 3h 07m || L1
|- align="center" bgcolor="bbffbb"
| 19 || April 23 || Rangers || 5–4 (11) || De La Rosa (1–0) || Ortiz (2–1) || || 35,353 || 8–11 || 3h 13m || W1
|- align="center" bgcolor="ffbbbb"
| 20 || April 24 || Rangers || 3–11 || Darvish (4–1) || Roth (1–1) || || 37,154 || 8–12 || 3h 22m || L1
|- align="center" bgcolor="ffbbbb"
| 21 || April 25 || @ Mariners || 0–6 || Maurer (2–3) || Richards (1–1) || || 13,000 || 8–13 || 2h 29m || L2
|- align="center" bgcolor="bbffbb"
| 22 || April 26 || @ Mariners || 6–3 || Wilson (2–0) || Harang (0–3) || Frieri (3) || 31,543 || 9–13 || 3h 34m || W1
|- align="center" bgcolor="ffbbbb"
| 23 || April 27 || @ Mariners || 2–3 || Hernández (3–2) || Blanton (0–4) || Wilhelmsen (7) || 31,901 || 9–14 || 2h 37m || L1
|- align="center" bgcolor="ffbbbb"
| 24 || April 28 || @ Mariners || 1–2 || Capps (2–1) || Vargas (0–3) || Wilhelmsen (8) || 20,638 || 9–15 || 2h 31m || L2
|- align="center" bgcolor="ffbbbb"
| 25 || April 29 || @ Athletics || 8–10 (19) || Blevins (2–0) || Enright (0–1) || || 11,668 || 9–16 || 6h 32m || L3
|- align="center" bgcolor="ffbbbb"
| 26 || April 30 || @ Athletics || 6–10 || Parker (1–4) || Richards (1–2) || || 14,764 || 9–17 || 3h 39m || L4
|-

|- align="center" bgcolor="bbffbb"
| 27 || May 1 || @ Athletics || 5–4 || Wilson (3–0) || Milone (3–3) || Frieri (4) || 17,139 || 10–17 || 3h 35m || W1
|- align="center" bgcolor="ffbbbb"
| 28 || May 2 || Orioles || 1–5 || Tillman (2–1) || Blanton (0–5) || || 35,118 || 10–18 || 2h 28m || L1
|- align="center" bgcolor="bbffbb"
| 29 || May 3 || Orioles || 4–0 || Vargas (1–3) || González (2–2) || || 40,140 || 11–18 || 2h 15m || W1
|- align="center" bgcolor="ffbbbb"
| 30 || May 4 || Orioles || 4–5 (10) || Hunter (1–1) || Richards (1–3) || Johnson (11) || 32,136 || 11–19 || 3h 43m || L1
|- align="center" bgcolor="ffbbbb"
| 31 || May 5 || Orioles || 4–8 || Hammel (5–1) || Williams (1–1) || O'Day (1) || 38,047 || 11–20 || 3h 34m || L2
|- align="center" bgcolor="ffbbbb"
| 32 || May 7 || @ Astros || 6–7 || Lyles (1–0) || Wilson (3–1) || Veras (3) || 15,266 || 11–21 || 2h 45m || L3
|- align="center" bgcolor="ffbbbb"
| 33 || May 8 || @ Astros || 1–3 || Norris (4–3) || Blanton (0–6) || Veras (4) || 12,906 || 11–22 || 2h 30m || L4
|- align="center" bgcolor="bbffbb"
| 34 || May 9 || @ Astros || 6–5 || Richards (2–3) || Ambriz (0–2) || Frieri (5) || 13,003 || 12–22 || 4h 07m || W1
|- align="center" bgcolor="bbffbb"
| 35 || May 10 || @ White Sox || 7–5 || Kohn (1–0) || Axelrod (0–3) || Frieri (6) || 22,638 || 13–22 || 3h 35m || W2
|- align="center" bgcolor="bbffbb"
| 36 || May 11 || @ White Sox || 3–2 || Williams (2–1) || Quintana (2–1) || Frieri (7) || 28,774 || 14–22 || 2h 48m || W3
|- align="center" bgcolor="ffbbbb"
| 37 || May 12 || @ White Sox || 0–3 || Sale (4–2) || Wilson (3–2) || || 22,088 || 14–23 || 2h 32m || L1
|- align="center" bgcolor="ffbbbb"
| 38 || May 13 || Royals || 4–11 || Mendoza (1–2) || Blanton (0–7) || Hochevar (1) || 32,203 || 14–24 || 3h 07m || L2
|- align="center" bgcolor="bbffbb"
| 39 || May 14 || Royals || 6–2 || Vargas (2–3) || Guthrie (5–1) || || 33,028 || 15–24 || 2h 32m || W1
|- align="center" bgcolor="ffbbbb"
| 40 || May 15 || Royals || 5–9 || Davis (3–3) || Enright (0–2) || || 31,917 || 15–25 || 3h 36m || L1
|- align="center" bgcolor="ffbbbb"
| 41 || May 16 || White Sox || 4–5 || Lindstrom (2–2) || De La Rosa (1–1) || Reed (13) || 37,711 || 15–26 || 3h 08m || L2
|- align="center" bgcolor="ffbbbb"
| 42 || May 17 || White Sox || 0–3 || Sale (5–2) || Wilson (3–3) || Reed (14) || 37,546 || 15–27 || 2h 48m || L3
|- align="center" bgcolor="bbffbb"
| 43 || May 18 || White Sox || 12–9 || Coello (1–0) || Jones (0–4) || Frieri (8) || 37,165 || 16–27 || 3h 50m || W1
|- align="center" bgcolor="bbffbb"
| 44 || May 19 || White Sox || 6–2 || Vargas (3–3) || Peavy (5–2) || Frieri (9) || 38,190 || 17–27 || 3h 04m || W2
|- align="center" bgcolor="bbffbb"
| 45 || May 21 || Mariners || 12–0 || Williams (3–1) || Harang (1–5) || || 34,095 || 18–27 || 2h 47m || W3
|- align="center" bgcolor="bbffbb"
| 46 || May 22 || Mariners || 7–1 || Wilson (4–3) || Maurer (2–6) || || 33,313 || 19–27 || 2h 44m || W4
|- align="center" bgcolor="bbffbb"
| 47 || May 23 || @ Royals || 5–4 || Blanton (1–7) || Santana (3–4) || Coello (1) || 18,784 || 20–27 || 2h 55m || W5
|- align="center" bgcolor="bbffbb"
| 48 || May 24 || @ Royals || 5–2 || Vargas (4–3) || Hochevar (0–1) || Richards (1) || 32,148 || 21–27 || 3h 01m || W6
|- align="center" bgcolor="bbffbb"
| 49 || May 25 || @ Royals || 7–0 || Buckner (1–0) || Guthrie (5–3) || || 27,958 || 22–27 || 2h 44m || W7
|- align="center" bgcolor="bbffbb"
| 50 || May 26 || @ Royals || 5–2 || Williams (4–1) || Davis (3–4) || Frieri (10) || 24,475 || 23–27 || 3h 38m || W8
|- align="center" bgcolor="ffbbbb"
| 51 || May 27 || @ Dodgers || 7–8 || Belisario (3–4) || Coello (1–1) || League (11) || 49,953 || 23–28 || 3h 37m || L1
|- align="center" bgcolor="ffbbbb"
| 52 || May 28 || @ Dodgers || 0–3 || Ryu (6–2) || Blanton (1–8) || || 46,433 || 23–29 || 2h 11m || L2
|- align="center" bgcolor="bbffbb"
| 53 || May 29 || Dodgers || 4–3 || Weaver (1–1) || Capuano (1–4) || Frieri (11) || 39,172 || 24–29 || 2h 50m || W1
|- align="center" bgcolor="bbffbb"
| 54 || May 30 || Dodgers || 3–2 || Vargas (5–3) || Lilly (0–2) || Frieri (12) || 42,231 || 25–29 || 2h 45m || W2
|- align="center" bgcolor="ffbbbb"
| 55 || May 31 || Astros || 3–6 || Keuchel (2–2) || Hanson (2–2) || Veras (9) || 34,401 || 25–30 || 3h 10m || L1
|-

|- align="center" bgcolor="ffbbbb"
| 56 || June 1 || Astros || 0–2 || Norris (5–4) || Williams (4–2) || Veras (10) || 40,087 || 25–31 || 3h 14m || L2
|- align="center" bgcolor="ffbbbb"
| 57 || June 2 || Astros || 4–5 || Lyles (3–1) || Wilson (4–4) || Ambriz (2) || 35,515 || 25–32 || 3h 19m || L3
|- align="center" bgcolor="ffbbbb"
| 58 || June 3 || Astros || 1–2 || Bédard (1–2) || Blanton (1–9) || Veras (11) || 30,010 || 25–33 || 2h 38m || L4
|- align="center" bgcolor="bbffbb"
| 59 || June 4 || Cubs || 4–3 || Coello (2–1) || Villanueva (1–4) || Frieri (13) || 32,223 || 26–33 || 3h 01m || W1
|- align="center" bgcolor="ffbbbb"
| 60 || June 5 || Cubs || 6–8 (10) || Gregg (2–0) || Coello (2–2) || || 30,171 || 26–34 || 4h 14m || L1
|- align="center" bgcolor="bbbbbb"
| – || June 7 || @ Red Sox || colspan=8| Postponed (rain). Makeup Date June 8.
|- align="center" bgcolor="bbffbb"
| 61 || June 8 || @ Red Sox || 9–5 || Hanson (3–2) || Doubront (4–3) || Frieri (14) || 34,499 || 27–34 || 4h 00m || W1
|- align="center" bgcolor="ffbbbb"
| 62 || June 8 || @ Red Sox || 2–7 || Buchholz (9–0) || Wilson (4–5) || || 36,518 || 27–35 || 3h 25m || L1
|- align="center" bgcolor="ffbbbb"
| 63 || June 9 || @ Red Sox || 5–10 || Dempster (4–6) || Blanton (1–10) || || 37,054 || 27–36 || 3h 33m || L2
|- align="center" bgcolor="ffbbbb"
| 64 || June 10 || @ Orioles || 3–4 || García (3–3) || Weaver (1–2) || Johnson (22) || 15,514 || 27–37 || 2h 23m || L3
|- align="center" bgcolor="ffbbbb"
| 65 || June 11 || @ Orioles || 2–3 || González (4–2) || Vargas (5–4) || Johnson (23) || 22,834 || 27–38 || 2h 42m || L4
|- align="center" bgcolor="bbffbb"
| 66 || June 12 || @ Orioles || 9–5 || Williams (5–2) || Strop (0–3) || || 25,964 || 28–38 || 3h 13m || W1
|- align="center" bgcolor="bbffbb"
| 67 || June 14 || Yankees || 5–2 || Wilson (5–5) || Pettitte (5–4) || Frieri (15) || 40,621 || 29–38 || 2h 53m || W2
|- align="center" bgcolor="bbffbb"
| 68 || June 15 || Yankees || 6–2 || Hanson (4–2) || Phelps (4–4) || || 40,486 || 30–38 || 3h 10m || W3
|- align="center" bgcolor="ffbbbb"
| 69 || June 16 || Yankees || 5–6 || Sabathia (7–5) || Weaver (1–3) || Rivera (24) || 41,204 || 30–39 || 2h 58m || L1
|- align="center" bgcolor="bbffbb"
| 70 || June 17 || Mariners || 11–3 || Vargas (6–4) || Harang (3–7) || || 30,258 || 31–39 || 2h 56m || W1
|- align="center" bgcolor="ffbbbb"
| 71 || June 18 || Mariners || 2–3 (10) || Furbush (1–3) || Richards (2–4) || Medina (1) || 33,040 || 31–40 || 3h 42m || L1
|- align="center" bgcolor="bbffbb"
| 72 || June 19 || Mariners || 1–0 || Wilson (6–5) || Saunders (5–7) || Frieri (16) || 35,401 || 32–40 || 2h 27m || W1
|- align="center" bgcolor="bbffbb"
| 73 || June 20 || Mariners || 10–9 || Downs (1–2) || Capps (2–2) || Frieri (17) || 37,711 || 33–40 || 3h 36m || W2
|- align="center" bgcolor="ffbbbb"
| 74 || June 21 || Pirates || 2–5 || Cole (3–0) || Weaver (1–4) || Grilli (26) || 40,136 || 33–41 || 2h 55m || L1
|- align="center" bgcolor="ffbbbb"
| 75 || June 22 || Pirates || 1–6 || Liriano (6–3) || Williams (5–3) || || 41,114 || 33–42 || 2h 52m || L2
|- align="center" bgcolor="ffbbbb"
| 76 || June 23 || Pirates || 9–10 (10) || Melancon (2–1) || Jepsen (0–2) || || 35,069 || 33–43 || 3h 55m || L3
|- align="center" bgcolor="bbffbb"
| 77 || June 25 || @ Tigers || 14–8 || Wilson (7–5) || Porcello (4–5) || || 34,402 || 34–43 || 4h 03m || W1
|- align="center" bgcolor="bbffbb"
| 78 || June 26 || @ Tigers || 7–4 || De La Rosa (2–1) || Álvarez (1–1) || Frieri (18) || 35,635 || 35–43 || 3h 06m || W2
|- align="center" bgcolor="bbffbb"
| 79 || June 27 || @ Tigers || 3–1 (10) || Jepsen (1–2) || Coke (0–5) || Frieri (19) || 39,496 || 36–43 || 3h 25m || W3
|- align="center" bgcolor="bbffbb"
| 80 || June 28 || @ Astros || 4–2 || De La Rosa (3–1) || Clemens (4–3) || Frieri (20) || 20,498 || 37–43 || 3h 49m || W4
|- align="center" bgcolor="bbffbb"
| 81 || June 29 || @ Astros || 7–2 || Blanton (2–10) || Lyles (4–3) || || 26,650 || 38–43 || 3h 01m || W5
|- align="center" bgcolor="bbffbb"
| 82 || June 30 || @ Astros || 3–1 || Wilson (8–5) || Cisnero (2–1) || Frieri (21) || 22,361 || 39–43 || 3h 08m || W6
|-

|- align="center" bgcolor="bbffbb"
| 83 || July 2 || Cardinals || 5–1 || Weaver (2–4) || Lynn (10–3) || || 39,455 || 40–43 || 2h 40m || W7
|- align="center" bgcolor="ffbbbb"
| 84 || July 3 || Cardinals || 2–12 || Miller (9–6) || Williams (5–4) || || 35,025 || 40–44 || 3h 22m || L1
|- align="center" bgcolor="bbffbb"
| 85 || July 4 || Cardinals || 6–5 || Downs (2–2) || Mujica (0–1) || || 42,707 || 41–44 || 2h 51m || W1
|- align="center" bgcolor="ffbbbb"
| 86 || July 5 || Red Sox || 2–6 || Doubront (5–3) || Wilson (8–6) || || 37,092 || 41–45 || 3h 14m || L1
|- align="center" bgcolor="bbffbb"
| 87 || July 6 || Red Sox || 9–7 (11) || De La Rosa (4–1) || Breslow (2–2) || || 36,112 || 42–45 || 4h 22m || W1
|- align="center" bgcolor="bbffbb"
| 88 || July 7 || Red Sox || 3–0 || Weaver (3–4) || Lackey (6–6) || Frieri (22) || 39,018 || 43–45 || 2h 57m || W2
|- align="center" bgcolor="ffbbbb"
| 89 || July 9 || @ Cubs || 2–7 || Wood (6–6) || Blanton (2–11) || || 31,579 || 43–46 || 2h 43m || L1
|- align="center" bgcolor="bbffbb"
| 90 || July 10 || @ Cubs || 13–2 || Wilson (9–6) || Samardzija (5–9) || || 31,111 || 44–46 || 3h 04m || W1
|- align="center" bgcolor="ffbbbb"
| 91 || July 12 || @ Mariners || 3–8 || Saunders (8–8) || Williams (5–5) || || 21,372 || 44–47 || 2h 45m || L1
|- align="center" bgcolor="ffbbbb"
| 92 || July 13 || @ Mariners || 0–6 || Hernández (10–4) || Weaver (3–5) || || 32,458 || 44–48 || 2h 57m || L2
|- align="center" bgcolor="ffbbbb"
| 93 || July 14 || @ Mariners || 3–4 || Iwakuma (8–4) || Blanton (2–12) || Wilhelmsen (19) || 25,629 || 44–49 || 2h 51m || L3
|- style="text-align:center;"
|colspan="11" style="background:#bbcaff;"|All-Star Break: AL defeats NL 3–0
|- align="center" bgcolor="bbffbb"
| 94 || July 19 || Athletics || 4–1 || Weaver (4–5) || Griffin (8–7) || Frieri (23) || 43,515 || 45–49 || 2h 58m || W1
|- align="center" bgcolor="bbffbb"
| 95 || July 20 || Athletics || 2–0 || Wilson (10–6) || Straily (6–3) || Frieri (24) || 43,572 || 46–49 || 2h 31m || W2
|- align="center" bgcolor="ffbbbb"
| 96 || July 21 || Athletics || 0–6 || Colón (13–3) || Williams (5–6) || || 37,441 || 46–50 || 2h 48m || L1
|- align="center" bgcolor="ffbbbb"
| 97 || July 22 || Twins || 3–4 || Deduno (6–4) || Blanton (2–13) || Perkins (24) || 33,363 || 46–51 || 3h 31m || L2
|- align="center" bgcolor="ffbbbb"
| 98 || July 23 || Twins || 3–10 (10) || Perkins (2–0) || Frieri (0–2) || || 39,177 || 46–52 || 3h 38m || L3
|- align="center" bgcolor="bbffbb"
| 99 || July 24 || Twins || 1–0 || Weaver (5–5) || Pelfrey (4–8) || Frieri (25) || 38,209 || 47–52 || 2h 43m || W1
|- align="center" bgcolor="bbffbb"
| 100 || July 25 || @ Athletics || 8–3 || Wilson (11–6) || Straily (6–4) || || 20,468 || 48–52 || 3h 13m || W2
|- align="center" bgcolor="ffbbbb"
| 101 || July 26 || @ Athletics || 4–6 || Colón (14–3) || Williams (5–7) || Balfour (27) || 27,429 || 48–53 || 3h 12m || L1
|- align="center" bgcolor="ffbbbb"
| 102 || July 27 || @ Athletics || 1–3 || Milone (9–8) || Downs (2–3) || Balfour (28) || 32,333 || 48–54 || 3h 03m || L2
|- align="center" bgcolor="ffbbbb"
| 103 || July 28 || @ Athletics || 6–10 || Chavez (2–2) || Gutierrez (0–2) || || 25,877 || 48–55 || 3h 31m || L3
|- align="center" bgcolor="ffbbbb"
| 104 || July 29 || @ Rangers || 3–4 || Frasor (1–2) || Frieri (0–3) || || 36,282 || 48–56 || 3h 04m || L4
|- align="center" bgcolor="ffbbbb"
| 105 || July 30 || @ Rangers || 11–14 (10) || Nathan (2–1) || Stange (0–1) || || 36,931 || 48–57 || 4h 46m || L5
|- align="center" bgcolor="ffbbbb"
| 106 || July 31 || @ Rangers || 1–2 || Nathan (3–1) || Kohn (1–1) || || 39,391 || 48–58 || 2h 30m || L6
|-

|- align="center" bgcolor="bbffbb"
| 107 || August 1 || Blue Jays || 8–2 || Richards (3–4) || Johnson (1–8) || || 37,179 || 49–58 || 2h 38m || W1
|- align="center" bgcolor="bbffbb"
| 108 || August 2 || Blue Jays || 7–5 || De La Rosa (5–1) || Delabar (5–2) || Frieri (26) || 38,884 || 50–58 || 3h 15m || W2
|- align="center" bgcolor="bbffbb"
| 109 || August 3 || Blue Jays || 7–3 || Weaver (6–5) || Rogers (3–6) || || 41,253 || 51–58 || 2h 35m || W3
|- align="center" bgcolor="ffbbbb"
| 110 || August 4 || Blue Jays || 5–6 || Cecil (5–1) || Frieri (0–4) || Janssen (19) || 33,936 || 51–59 || 3h 05m || L1
|- align="center" bgcolor="ffbbbb"
| 111 || August 5 || Rangers || 2–5 || Pérez (4–3) || Williams (5–8) || Nathan (33) || 34,040 || 51–60 || 3h 01m || L2
|- align="center" bgcolor="ffbbbb"
| 112 || August 6 || Rangers || 3–8 || Darvish (11–5) || Jepsen (1–3) || Scheppers (1) || 34,233 || 51–61 || 3h 12m || L3
|- align="center" bgcolor="ffbbbb"
| 113 || August 7 || Rangers || 3–10 || Ogando (5–3) || Hanson (4–3) || || 34,777 || 51–62 || 3h 51m || L4
|- align="center" bgcolor="bbffbb"
| 114 || August 9 || @ Indians || 5–2 || Weaver (7–5) || Kazmir (7–5) || De La Rosa (1) || 28,729 || 52–62 || 2h 50m || W1
|- align="center" bgcolor="bbffbb"
| 115 || August 10 || @ Indians || 7–2 || Wilson (12–6) || Jiménez (8–7) || || 32,733 || 53–62 || 3h 41m || W2
|- align="center" bgcolor="ffbbbb"
| 116 || August 11 || @ Indians || 5–6 || Albers (3–1) || Gutiérrez (0–3) || Perez (18) || 23,433 || 53–63 || 3h 13m || L1
|- align="center" bgcolor="ffbbbb"
| 117 || August 12 || @ Yankees || 1–2 || Kuroda (11–7) || Richards (3–5) || Robertson (1) || 37,146 || 53–64 || 2h 42m || L2
|- align="center" bgcolor="ffbbbb"
| 118 || August 13 || @ Yankees || 7–14 || Sabathia (10–10) || Vargas (6–5) || || 35,013 || 53–65 || 3h 33m || L3
|- align="center" bgcolor="ffbbbb"
| 119 || August 14 || @ Yankees || 3–11 || Nova (6–4) || Weaver (7–6) || || 38,379 || 53–66 || 2h 40m || L4
|- align="center" bgcolor="bbffbb"
| 120 || August 15 || @ Yankees || 8–4 || Wilson (13–6) || Hughes (4–12) || || 44,682 || 54–66 || 3h 49m || W1
|- align="center" bgcolor="ffbbbb"
| 121 || August 16 || Astros || 2–8 || Peacock (2–4) || Williams (5–9) || || 39,074 || 54–67 || 3h 48m || L1
|- align="center" bgcolor="bbffbb"
| 122 || August 17 || Astros || 6–5 (10) || Frieri (1–14) || Fields (1–3) || || 40,246 || 55–67 || 3h 48m || W1
|- align="center" bgcolor="ffbbbb"
| 123 || August 18 || Astros || 5–7 || Oberholtzer (3–1) || Gutiérrez (0–4) || Chapman (1) || 36,896 || 55–68 || 3h 22m || L1
|- align="center" bgcolor="ffbbbb"
| 124 || August 19 || Indians || 2–5 || McAllister (6–7) || Weaver (7–7) || || 36,574 || 55–69 || 3h 03m || L2
|- align="center" bgcolor="ffbbbb"
| 125 || August 20 || Indians || 1–4 (14) || Carrasco (1–4) || Blanton (2–14) || || 36,421 || 55–70 || 5h 17m || L3
|- align="center" bgcolor="ffbbbb"
| 126 || August 21 || Indians || 1–3 || Masterson (14–9) || Williams (5–10) || Perez (20) || 35,810 || 55–71 || 2h 59m ||L4
|- align="center" bgcolor="bbffbb"
| 127 || August 23 || @ Mariners || 2–0 || Richards (4–5) || Hernández (12–7) || Frieri (27) || 21,616 || 56–71 || 2h 45m || W1
|- align="center" bgcolor="bbffbb"
| 128 || August 24 || @ Mariners || 5–1 || Vargas (7–5) || Ramírez (4–1) || || 24,477 || 57–71 || 3h 18m || W2
|- align="center" bgcolor="bbffbb"
| 129 || August 25 || @ Mariners || 7–1 || Weaver (8–7) || Harang (5–11) || || 23,001 || 58–71 || 2h 50m || W3
|- align="center" bgcolor="bbffbb"
| 130 || August 27 || @ Rays || 6–5 || Frieri (2–4) || Rodney (5–4) || De La Rosa (2) || 12,939 || 59–71 || 3h 36m || W4
|- align="center" bgcolor="ffbbbb"
| 131 || August 28 || @ Rays || 1–4 || Archer (8–5) || Richards (4–6) || Rodney (31) || 13,535 || 59–72 || 2h 47m || L1
|- align="center" bgcolor="bbffbb"
| 132 || August 29 || @ Rays || 2–0 || Vargas (8–5) || Odorizzi (0–1) || Frieri (28) || 15,741 || 60–72 || 3h 02m || W1
|- align="center" bgcolor="bbffbb"
| 133 || August 30 || @ Brewers || 5–0 || Weaver (9–7) || Peralta (8–14) || || 32,340 || 61–72 || 3h 16m || W2
|- align="center" bgcolor="bbffbb"
| 134 || August 31 || @ Brewers || 6–5 || De La Rosa (6–1) || Henderson (3–4) || Frieri (29) || 28,175 || 62–72 || 3h 19m || W3
|-

|- align="center" bgcolor="bbffbb"
| 135 || September 1 || @ Brewers || 5–3 || Wilson (14–6) || Wooten (3–1) || Frieri (30) || 29,733 || 63–72 || 3h 06m || W4
|- align="center" bgcolor="bbffbb"
| 136 || September 2 || Rays || 11–2 || Richards (5–6) || Archer (8–6) || || 37,557 || 64–72 || 3h 58m || W5
|- align="center" bgcolor="ffbbbb"
| 137 || September 3 || Rays || 1–7 || Moore (15–3) || Vargas (8–6) || Hernández (1) || 34,332 || 64–73 || 3h 07m || L1
|- align="center" bgcolor="ffbbbb"
| 138 || September 4 || Rays || 1–3 || Hellickson (11–8) || Weaver (9–8) || Rodney (32) || 34,025 || 64–74 || 2h 54m || L2
|- align="center" bgcolor="bbffbb"
| 139 || September 5 || Rays || 6–2 || Williams (6–10) || Price (8–7) || || 34,623 || 65–74 || 2h 49m || W1
|- align="center" bgcolor="bbffbb"
| 140 || September 6 || Rangers || 6–5 || Wilson (15–6) || Garza (9–4) || Frieri (31) || 39,591 || 66–74 || 2h 51m || W2
|- align="center" bgcolor="bbffbb"
| 141 || September 7 || Rangers || 8–3 || Richards (6–6) || Holland (9–8) || || 40,558 || 67–74 || 3h 10m || W3
|- align="center" bgcolor="ffbbbb"
| 142 || September 8 || Rangers || 3–4 || Ogando (6–4) || Kohn (1–2) || Nathan (39) || 35,423 || 67–75 || 3h 31m || L1
|- align="center" bgcolor="ffbbbb"
| 143 || September 9 || @ Twins || 3–6 || Fien (4–2) || Rasmus (0–1) || Perkins (33) || 21,826 || 67–76 || 3h 19m || L2
|- align="center" bgcolor="bbffbb"
| 144 || September 10 || @ Blue Jays || 12–6 || Williams (7–10) || Buehrle (11–8) || || 19,079 || 68–76 || 2h 43m || W1
|- align="center" bgcolor="bbffbb"
| 145 || September 11 || @ Blue Jays || 5–4 || Wilson (16–6) || Delabar (5–3) || Frieri (32) || 17,994 || 69–76 || 2h 43m || W2
|- align="center" bgcolor="bbffbb"
| 146 || September 12 || @ Blue Jays || 4–3 || Richards (7–6) || Happ (4–6) || Frieri (33) || 20,767 || 70–76 || 3h 10m || W3
|- align="center" bgcolor="ffbbbb"
| 147 || September 13 || @ Astros || 7–9 || Keuchel (6–9) || Vargas (8–7) || Fields (5) || 19,742 || 70–77 || 3h 10m || L1
|- align="center" bgcolor="bbffbb"
| 148 || September 14 || @ Astros || 6–2 || Weaver (10–8) || Oberholtzer (4–3) || || 21,905 || 71–77 || 3h 11m || W1
|- align="center" bgcolor="bbffbb"
| 149 || September 15 || @ Astros || 2–1 || Williams (8–10) || Clemens (4–5) || Frieri (34) || 21,374 || 72–77 || 2h 57m || W2
|- align="center" bgcolor="bbffbb"
| 150 || September 16 || @ Athletics || 12–1 || Wilson (17–6) || Parker (11–7) || || 14,629 || 73–77 || 3h 09m || W3
|- align="center" bgcolor="ffbbbb"
| 151 || September 17 || @ Athletics || 1–2 || Balfour (1–3) || Kohn (1–3) || || 18,771 || 73–78 || 3h 26m || L1
|- align="center" bgcolor="bbffbb"
| 152 || September 18 || @ Athletics || 5–4 (11) || Gutiérrez (1–4) || Chavez (2–4) || Frieri (35) || 74–78 || 20,260 || 3h 19m || W1
|- align="center" bgcolor="bbffbb"
| 153 || September 20 || Mariners || 3–2 (11) || Rasmus (1–1) || LaFromboise (0–1) || || 39,469 || 75–78 || 4h 10m || W2
|- align="center" bgcolor="bbffbb"
| 154 || September 21 || Mariners || 6–5 || Williams (9–10) || Saunders (11–16) || Frieri (36) || 41,001 || 76–78 || 3h 01m || W3
|- align="center" bgcolor="ffbbbb"
| 155 || September 22 || Mariners || 2–3 || Pérez (3–3) || Wilson (17–7) || Farquhar (15) || 39,099 || 76–79 || 3h 22m || L1
|- align="center" bgcolor="ffbbbb"
| 156 || September 23 || Athletics || 5–10 || Milone (12–9) || Richards (7–7) || || 41,147 || 76–80 || 3h 07m || L2
|- align="center" bgcolor="bbffbb"
| 157 || September 24 || Athletics || 3–0 || Vargas (9–7) || Griffin (14–10) || || 38,158 || 77–80 || 2h 17m || W1
|- align="center" bgcolor="bbffbb"
| 158 || September 25 || Athletics || 3–1 || Weaver (11–8) || Straily (10–8) || Frieri (37) || 36,226 || 78–80 || 2h 31m || W2
|- align="center" bgcolor="ffbbbb"
| 159 || September 26 || @ Rangers || 5–6 || Nathan (6–2) || Kohn (1–4) || || 26,198 || 78–81 || 3h 22m || L1
|- align="center" bgcolor="ffbbbb"
| 160 || September 27 || @ Rangers || 3–5 || Cotts (7–3) || Gutiérrez (1–5) || Nathan (42) || 37,355 || 78–82 || 3h 31m || L2
|- align="center" bgcolor="ffbbbb"
| 161 || September 28 || @ Rangers || 4–7 || Soria (1–0) || Richards (7–8) || Nathan (43) || 38,635 || 78–83 || 3h 18m || L3
|- align="center" bgcolor="ffbbbb"
| 162 || September 29 || @ Rangers || 2–6 || Cotts (8–3) || Vargas (9–8) || || 40,057 || 78–84 || 2h 57m || L4
|-

Quick notes 
On April 29, with 19 innings of play; the duration of the game was 6 hours and 32 minutes long. This duration was the longest game time for both clubs, the Angels and the Oakland Athletics.

Farm system

LEAGUE CHAMPIONS: Inland Empire

See also

Los Angeles Angels of Anaheim
Angel Stadium of Anaheim

References

External links
2013 Los Angeles Angels of Anaheim Official Site
2013 Los Angeles Angels of Anaheim season at Baseball Reference

Los Angeles Angels seasons
Los Angeles Angels of Anaheim
Los